Lawder is a surname. Notable people with the surname include:

 Edward James Lawder (1821–1900), British military officer
 Harry C. Lawder (1844–1921), American politician
 Margaret Lawder (1900–1983), Irish and South African botanist
 Nicole Lawder (born 1962), Australian politician
 Robert R. Lawder (died 1967), American politician
 Standish Lawder (1936–2014), American artist and historian